Wealthy Consuelo Babcock (November 11, 1895 – April 10, 1990) was an American mathematician. She was awarded a Ph.D. from the University of Kansas and had a long teaching career at that institution.

Early life and education

Wealthy Consuelo Babcock was born in Washington County, Kansas, the second child of Ella Babcock (nee, Kerr) and Cassius Lincoln Babcock. She graduated in 1913 from Washington County High School and taught for two years in one-room country schools in Washington County. The following year, she matriculated at the University of Kansas where she was a member of the women's basketball team. After receiving her Bachelor of Arts in 1919, she taught for a year at Neodesha High School in southeastern Kansas. She then returned to the University of Kansas in 1920 as an instructor.

Career at the University of Kansas 

In addition to teaching at the University, Wealthy pursued her graduate studies, earning a master's in 1922 and a doctorate with a minor in physics in 1926. She was promoted to assistant professor in 1926 and to associate professor in 1940. She retired in 1966. During her tenure on the Kansas faculty, she regularly attended meetings of the Kansas Section of the Mathematical Association of America.

She was an outstanding teacher and for thirty years she was the mathematics department's librarian.

Last years 

After her retirement, Wealthy Babcock was honored by the dedication of the Wealthy Babcock Mathematics Library. She served on many committees on scholarships and awards and was particularly active in the KU Alumni Association's activities, for which she received the Fred Ellsworth Medallion, the highest award for service, in 1977.

Wealthy Babcock died in 1990 at ninety-four at Presbyterian Manor in Lawrence, Kansas. She was cremated and interred in the Pioneer Cemetery on the campus of the university.

References

External links 
 Women’s Hall of Fame, KU Emily Taylor Center for Women and Gender Equality
 Mathematics Genealogy Project
 Bill Mayer, “Rabid KU Fans Prove Basketballs Mass Appeal,” _Lawrence Journal-World_, 23 Jan 2005. 
 Professor Tom Levin, “Interview with Wealthy Babcock,” Oral History of the Retirees Club, The University of Kansas, Summer of 1985.
 

1895 births
1990 deaths
Burials in Kansas
University of Kansas faculty
Kansas Jayhawks women's basketball players
American women mathematicians
20th-century American mathematicians
People from Washington County, Kansas
20th-century women mathematicians
Mathematicians from Kansas
20th-century American women